Pétur Pétursson (3 October 1808 – 15 May 1891) was a prominent political leader in Iceland, eventually becoming the fourth Bishop of Iceland from 1866 to 1889.

Biography
Pétursson was born in Blönduhlíð, the son of Péturs Péturssonar, a professor in Víðivöllur and his second wife, Thóra Brynjólfsdóttir. He was one of the well-known Víðivalli brothers, the others were Jón Pétursson Supreme Court Judge and Brynjólfur Pétursson, a lawyer. 

Pétur and his brother Brynjólfur were educated by the Reverend Einar Thorlacius in Goðdölar and later in Eyjafjörður. Jónas Hallgrímsson was their fellow student. He earned a theology degree from the University of Copenhagen in 1834. He served as a pastor at Helgafell and Stedarstaður and a pastor in the Snæfellsnes peninsula. In 1847 he was appointed director of the Prestaskólan. He was appointed bishop of Iceland in 1866 and served his office for 23 years. He retired on April 16, 1889. He was king's elected member of parliament from 1849 to 1887 and Mayor of Reykjavik from 1849 to 1851 and 1855 to 1856. He served as speaker of the Althing from 1879 to 1881. He is also the author of numerous books.

His first wife was Anna Sigríður Aradóttir from Flugumýri who died in 1839 after a short marriage. His second wife was Sigríður Bogadóttir, the daughter of Boga Benediktsson and Jarðrúður Jónsdóttir.

References

Lutheran bishops of Iceland
1808 births
1891 deaths
19th-century Lutheran bishops
Speakers of the Althing